

120001–120100 

|-id=038
| 120038 Franlainsher ||  || Frances Fisher (born 1944) and Elaine Fisher (born 1946), former wife and sister-in-law of the discoverer James Whitney Young, respectively. || 
|-id=040
| 120040 Pagliarini ||  || Silvano Pagliarini (born 1950), Italian amateur astronomer, builder of the public amateur observatory "Padre Angelo Secchi" in Castelnovo Sotto. || 
|-id=074
| 120074 Bass || 2003 EA || Harry Bass (born 1935) graduated from the University of Pennsylvania Medical School in 1960. In 1977, he joined the Staff of Memorial Medical Center, Las Cruces, New Mexico, established a private practice, and is a highly respected physician by both his peers and his patients. || 
|}

120101–120200 

|-id=103
| 120103 Dolero ||  || Dominique Lherault (born 1945), maiden name of the wife of French amateur astronomer Bernard Christophe who discovered this minor planet || 
|-id=112
| 120112 Elizabethacton ||  || Elizabeth A. Acton (born 1981) contributed to the OSIRIS-REx asteroid sample-return mission as Project Support Specialist. || 
|-id=120
| 120120 Kankelborg ||  || Charles Kankelborg (born 1967), American astrophysicist || 
|-id=121
| 120121 Libbyadelman ||  || Libby Adelman (born 1971) contributed to the NASA OSIRIS-REx asteroid sample-return mission as Instrument Manager for the OLA, OVIRS and REXIS instruments. || 
|-id=141
| 120141 Lucaslara ||  || Lucas Lara Garrido (1966–2006), Spanish astrophysicist who researched active galactic nuclei at the Instituto de Astrofísica de Andalucía || 
|-id=153
| 120153 Hoekenga ||  || B. Christine Hoekenga (born 1981) worked on the OSIRIS-REx asteroid sample-return mission as the social media lead in the Principal Investigator's office || 
|-id=174
| 120174 Jeffjenny ||  || Jeffrey Young (born 1966) and Jennifer Young (born 1967), son and daughter of the American astronomer James Whitney Young who discovered this minor planet || 
|-id=186
| 120186 Suealeman ||  || Sue Aleman (born 1957) contributed to the OSIRIS-REx asteroid sample-return mission as Chief Safety and Mission Assurance Officer. || 
|-id=188
| 120188 Amyaqueche ||  || Amy A. Aqueche (born 1975) contributed to the OSIRIS-REx asteroid sample-return mission as the Contracting Officer (CO). Prior to OSIRIS-REx, she served as the NASA CO for MAVEN and the USACE CO in support of Ft. Stewart and Hunter Army Air Field Operations in Savannah, Georgia. || 
|-id=191
| 120191 Tombagg ||  || Thomas C. Bagg III (born 1952) is the Risk Manager for the OSIRIS-REx asteroid sample-return mission. Prior to this role, he supported the GSFC SBIR program, the HST SM4, NOAA-N and NOAA-N Prime missions. He helped develop the GSFC Systems Engineering Education Development Program || 
|-id=196
| 120196 Kevinballou ||  || Kevin M. Ballou (born 1969), an engineer at the NASA Goddard Space Flight Center, contributed to the OSIRIS-REx asteroid sample-return mission as C&DH Electrical Systems Engineer. || 
|}

120201–120300 

|-id=208
| 120208 Brentbarbee ||  || Brent Barbee (born 1981), a member of the Flight Dynamics System team for the OSIRIS-REx asteroid sample-return mission. || 
|-id=214
| 120214 Danteberdeguez ||  || Dante Berdeguez (born 1976) is a Spacecraft Systems Engineer at NASA's Goddard Spaceflight Center. He specializes in both spacecraft and ground system integration and testing. He contributed to the OSIRIS-REx asteroid sample-return mission as Ground Systems Readiness Test Engineer. || 
|-id=215
| 120215 Kevinberry ||  || Kevin E. Berry (born 1980) contributed to the OSIRIS-REx asteroid sample-return mission as the FDS TAG Mission Phase Lead and is a member of the Navigation and Mission Design Branch at NASA Goddard Space Flight Center. He was also part of the flight dynamics teams for SDO, LCROSS and MAVEN. || 
|-id=218
| 120218 Richardberry ||  || Richard P. Berry Jr. (born 1955) contributed to the OSIRIS-REx asteroid sample-return mission as Configuration Control Manager. || 
|-id=285
| 120285 Brentbos ||  || Brent J. Bos (born 1969), the OSIRIS-REx asteroid sample-return mission TAGCAMS instrument scientist. || 
|-id=299
| 120299 Billlynch ||  || Bill Lynch (born 1962) has worked tirelessly for many years assisting amateur and professional astronomers with their CCD cameras and related equipment || 
|}

120301–120400 

|-id=308
| 120308 Deebradel ||  || Deanna Bradel (born 1964), a Financial Manager for the OSIRIS-REx asteroid sample-return mission. || 
|-id=324
| 120324 Falusandrás ||  || András Falus (born 1947) is a Hungarian immunologist, full professor of the Semmelweis University, and member of the Hungarian Academy of Sciences. His major field is immunogenomics, allergies and oncogenomics. He was the winner of the 2001 annual science communication award of the Club of Hungarian Science Journalists. || 
|-id=347
| 120347 Salacia ||  || Salacia, Roman goddess of salt water, Neptune's wife. || 
|-id=349
| 120349 Kalas ||  || John Kalas (born 1948) and Elizabeth Kalas (born 1949) are active in proselytizing the night sky at public events || 
|-id=350
| 120350 Richburns ||  || Rich Burns (born 1967) contributed to the OSIRIS-REx asteroid sample-return mission as SSMO Project Manager || 
|-id=351
| 120351 Beckymasterson ||  || Rebecca A. Masterson (born 1975) is a research engineer at the Massachusetts Institute of Technology serving tirelessly in the central role of Instrument Manager for the student-built Regolith X-ray Imaging Spectrometer aboard the OSIRIS-REx asteroid sample-return mission. || 
|-id=352
| 120352 Gordonwong ||  || Gordon H. Wong (born 1969) is a software engineer who has shown great patience and dedicated support to the effort required in the design, build, test, and flight of the student-built Regolith X-ray Imaging Spectrometer aboard the OSIRIS-REx asteroid sample-return mission. || 
|-id=353
| 120353 Katrinajackson ||  || Katrina Jackson (born 1989) is a video producer for the OSIRIS-REx asteroid sample-return mission and the Hubble Space Telescope at NASA's Goddard Space Flight Center || 
|-id=354
| 120354 Mikejones ||  || Michael Paul Jones (born 1991) worked as a student engineer at the Massachusetts Institute of Technology where he designed and implemented the solar X-ray monitor as a comparison instrument for the student-built Regolith X-ray Imaging Spectrometer aboard the OSIRIS-REx asteroid sample-return mission. || 
|-id=361
| 120361 Guido || 2005 NZ || Ernesto Guido (born 1977), Italian amateur astronomer and discoverer of minor planets || 
|-id=364
| 120364 Stevecooley ||  || Steve Cooley (born 1961) contributed to the OSIRIS-REx asteroid sample-return mission as Lead Flight Dynamics Engineer (proposal/Phase A). || 
|-id=367
| 120367 Grabow ||  || Walter Grabow (1913–1987) was the owner of the Polaris Telescope Shop in Dearborn, Michigan in the 1960s. His patience and guidance helped many amateur astronomers in building or buying their telescopes. || 
|-id=368
| 120368 Phillipcoulter ||  || Phillip Coulter (born 1973), an Optical Engineer working at the NASA Goddard Space Flight Center. || 
|-id=375
| 120375 Kugel ||  || François Kugel (born 1959), French comet observer and a discoverer of minor planets || 
|}

120401–120500 

|-id=405
| 120405 Svyatylivka ||  || Svyatylivka, Ukraine, one of the headquarters of the Cossack army since the 17th century || 
|-id=452
| 120452 Schombert || 1988 NA || James Schombert (born 1957) is an observational cosmologist, who started working during the second Palomar Observatory Sky Survey. He is now an astronomy professor at the University of Oregon working on galaxy formation and evolution and the interaction with dark matter using telescopes such as HST and Spitzer. || 
|-id=460
| 120460 Hambach ||  || The Hambach Festival of 1832, held in the Maxburg castle above the village of Hambach, Germany, where some 30 000 liberals and democrats demonstrated in favour of a free and united Germany || 
|-id=461
| 120461 Gandhi ||  || Mahatma Gandhi (1869–1948) was an Indian lawyer who advocated the complete independence of India. Gandhi believed that nonviolence was the path to liberty, and he became a model for many. || 
|-id=462
| 120462 Amanohashidate ||  || Amanohashidate, a well-known tourist spot in Japan || 
|-id=481
| 120481 Johannwalter ||  || Johann Walter (1496–1570), German cantor, director of the Saxon court orchestra, who wrote the melody of the hymn Each morning with its newborn light || 
|}

120501–120600 

|-id=569
| 120569 Huangrunqian ||  || Huang Runqian (born 1933), Chinese astrophysicist and academician of the Chinese Academy of Sciences || 
|}

120601–120700 

|-id=643
| 120643 Rudimandl || 1996 RU || Rudi W. Mandl (1894–1948), Czech-German electrical engineer and amateur astronomer, was interested in gravitational lensing. || 
|}

120701–120800 

|-id=730
| 120730 Zhouyouyuan ||  || Zhou Youyuan (born 1938) is a leading astrophysicist and a member of the Chinese Academy of Sciences. He has made significant contributions to the study of quasars, active galactic nuclei, cosmology, large scale structures of the universe, and high-energy astrophysics. || 
|-id=735
| 120735 Ogawakiyoshi ||  || Kiyoshi Ogawa (born 1957) is a member of Matsue Astronomy Club. He popularizes astronomy in Shimane prefecture and is an observing partner of the discoverer, Hiroshi Abe. || 
|-id=741
| 120741 Iijimayuichi ||  || Yuichi Iijima (1968–2012) was a Japanese aerospace system engineer of the Japan Aerospace Exploration Agency, who was one of the key members of the Japanese lunar orbiter SELENE. || 
|}

120801–120900 

|-bgcolor=#f2f2f2
| colspan=4 align=center | 
|}

120901–121000 

|-id=942
| 120942 Rendafuzhong ||  || "Rendafuzhong" is a Chinese high school affiliated with Renmin University, located in Beijing Zhongguancun Technology Park || 
|}

References 

120001-121000